Fred Sersen (February 24, 1890 – December 11, 1962) was an American painter and cinema special effects artist working mainly at 20th Century Fox Studios from the 1930s to the 1950s with credits in over 200 movies. He won two Academy Awards for Best Effects, Special Effects (photographic), in 1940 for The Rains Came, and in 1944 for Crash Dive. An artificial lake created for the former film was named in his honor.

Biography
Fred Sersen was born Ferdinand Metoděj Sršeň, February 24, 1890, in Veselí nad Moravou, then a part of Austria-Hungary, At the age of 17 he moved to the United States. He studied art at the Los Angeles School of Art and Design, the Portland Art Academy, and the San Francisco Institute of Art. His first credited film was A Connecticut Yankee (1931). In 1937 he recreated the 1871 Great Chicago Fire on the screen for the film In Old Chicago. Other notable effects for which he is credited include the fire in Hangover Square, the flying saucer in The Day the Earth Stood Still, and the sinking of the ship in Titanic.

He died December 11, 1962 in Los Angeles, California.

Awards

References

External links
 
 Entry at askart.com

1890 births
1962 deaths
Best Visual Effects Academy Award winners
Special effects people
Austro-Hungarian emigrants to the United States
People from Veselí nad Moravou